Matakatia is a suburb situated on the Whangaparaoa Peninsula, towards the northern end of Auckland, New Zealand. It is about 43 kilometres (by road) north of the city centre.

Kotanui Island, also called Frenchmans Cap, is a sharp triangular rock rising from the water about 1,000 metres offshore.

History
The Waiau portage between Matakatia and Tindalls Beach allowed the movement of waka in the early 19th century.

A road was developed through the area in 1938 and sections were sold the following year.

The area to the north was Tindall's farm in the 1920s and is now the suburb of Tindalls Beach.

Demographics

Tindalls-Matakatia had a population of 1,977 at the 2018 New Zealand census, an increase of 228 people (13.0%) since the 2013 census, and an increase of 429 people (27.7%) since the 2006 census. There were 723 households, comprising 981 males and 999 females, giving a sex ratio of 0.98 males per female. The median age was 47.8 years (compared with 37.4 years nationally), with 315 people (15.9%) aged under 15 years, 303 (15.3%) aged 15 to 29, 930 (47.0%) aged 30 to 64, and 429 (21.7%) aged 65 or older.

Ethnicities were 92.1% European/Pākehā, 6.1% Māori, 2.1% Pacific peoples, 5.6% Asian, and 2.1% other ethnicities. People may identify with more than one ethnicity.

The percentage of people born overseas was 32.3, compared with 27.1% nationally.

Although some people chose not to answer the census's question about religious affiliation, 49.2% had no religion, 40.1% were Christian, 0.5% were Hindu, 0.2% were Muslim, 0.3% were Buddhist and 2.1% had other religions.

Of those at least 15 years old, 378 (22.7%) people had a bachelor's or higher degree, and 192 (11.6%) people had no formal qualifications. The median income was $36,200, compared with $31,800 nationally. 423 people (25.5%) earned over $70,000 compared to 17.2% nationally. The employment status of those at least 15 was that 741 (44.6%) people were employed full-time, 276 (16.6%) were part-time, and 51 (3.1%) were unemployed.

Notes

Populated places in the Auckland Region
Beaches of the Auckland Region
Hibiscus Coast